Tetrodontium brownianum is a species of moss commonly known as Brown's tetrodontium moss or Brown's four-tooth moss. It is widely distributed. In North America it is found in Washington state and British Columbia on the west coast and from Newfoundland to Ohio to the east. It is also present in Austria, France, Germany, Ireland, Norway, Sweden, Switzerland and the United Kingdom as well as Japan, New Zealand and Chile.

It is named after Robert Brown, the Scottish botanist who first discovered the plant growing at Roslin near Edinburgh in the late 18th century whilst still a student. The plant can still be found at the site of its discovery.

See also
Endemic Scottish mosses:
 Bryoerythrophyllum caledonicum
 Bryum dixonii
 Pohlia scotica
Flora of Scotland

References

Tetraphidopsida
Flora of Europe
Flora of North America
Flora of Chile
Flora of Japan
Flora of New Zealand